Ceriano Laghetto-Groane railway station is a railway station in Italy. Located on the Saronno–Seregno railway, it serves the municipality of Ceriano Laghetto, and particularly the Groane Park.

Services 
Ceriano Laghetto-Groane is served by line S9 of the Milan suburban railway service, operated by the Lombard railway company Trenord.

See also 
Milan suburban railway service

References 

Railway stations in Lombardy
Milan S Lines stations
Railway stations opened in 2012